Unbelievable Truth were a British rock band, led by Andy Yorke, with Nigel Powell, Jason Moulster, and Jim Crosskey. Their sound has been described as "slow, melancholy, country-tinged ballads, wrapped in a soft blanket of acoustic guitars and minor chords".

History
The band was formed in 1993 in Oxford, England, and named after Hal Hartley's film, The Unbelievable Truth. A crisis of confidence led to a split in 1995, during which time Yorke took to exile in Russia. Upon his return in 1996, the band released their first single, "Building" in February 1997 on Shifty Disco, a record label based in Oxford. They released their first album, Almost Here, in 1998 on Virgin, and although being subsequently dropped by Virgin, the album had some success. In 2000, the band released their next album Sorrythankyou on Shifty Disco, the first from that label to be pressed in vinyl.

The group parted ways in 2000, due to Yorke's decision to leave the band. In 2001, Unbelievable Truth released a double album, self-published, called Misc. Music. Disc 1 contained b-sides and unreleased tracks, while disc 2 was the live recording of their farewell show held at the Zodiac in Oxford on 16 September 2000.

Since then, all of the members have gone on to other musical projects. Drummer Nigel Powell formed a new band, The Sad Song Co., and has been playing with another Oxford band Dive Dive (formerly Dustball). They have released three singles and one album, and are currently at work on their second LP. Powell has been working and touring with folk singer/songwriter Frank Turner since his solo career began, performing on all of his records to date with fellow Dive Dive members Ben Lloyd and Tarrant Anderson. Jim Crosskey and Jason Moulster became part of the group Nine Stone Cowboy, along with members of other defunct Oxford bands The Candyskins and Ride.

The band reunited for a one-off concert in Oxford to support tsunami victims on 19 February 2005. In May 2007, Unbelievable Truth, as a three piece ensemble, played an acoustic set at the closing night of the Oxford venue, The Zodiac, before a summer refit.

In 2007, former frontman Yorke completed his first solo effort with the help of ex-bandmates Powell and  Moulster. The album Simple was released on 14 July 2008.

Discography

Albums
Almost Here (1998) - UK No. 21
Sorrythankyou (2000)
Misc. Music (2001)

EPs
Stone - EP (1997)
Higher Than Reason - EP (1998)
Settle Down / Sea Dune - EP (1998)
Solved - EP (1998)

Singles
"Building" (1997)
"Stone" / "Finest Little Space" (1997)
"Higher Than Reason" (1998) - UK No. 38
"Solved" (1998) - UK No. 39
"Settle Down" / "Dune Sea" (1998) - UK No. 46
"Agony" (2000)
"Landslide" (2000)
"Advice to a Lover" (2000)

References

External links
Official Unbelievable Truth Website
Official Andy Yorke Website
Official Andy Yorke MySpace
Official Nigel Powell website
Lewis Slade's fan website, inc. free rarities download

English rock music groups
Music in Oxford
Musical groups established in 1993
Musical groups from Oxford